Paulo Tuvale (born 22 January 1954) is a Samoan boxer. He competed in the men's middleweight event at the 1984 Summer Olympics.

References

1954 births
Living people
Middleweight boxers
Samoan male boxers
Olympic boxers of Samoa
Boxers at the 1984 Summer Olympics
Place of birth missing (living people)